Volos Municipal Stadium is a sports stadium in Volos, Greece used for football matches. This stadium was built in 1968 and it was renovated in 2004 since it was one of the Olympic training venues of the 2004 Summer Olympic Games. It has a capacity of 9,000 people and it is the homeground of the local football club Olympiacos Volos. Record attendance is 17.200 spectators but this was before plastic seats were placed. The complete reconstruction of this stadium was planned to begin at summer 2014. However, due to economic problems of the club the reconstruction never started but some improvements have already been made.

External links
http://www.stadia.gr/volos/volos.html

Football venues in Greece
Sport in Volos